Joy or Joyce Brown may refer to:

 Joyce F. Brown (born 1947), African American academic, President of Fashion Institute of Technology
 Joyce Patricia Brown (1947–2005), whose case against New York City made legal precedent against involuntary psychiatric commitment of the homeless
 Joyce Brown (beauty queen), winner in 1954 of the National Sweetheart beauty pageant
 Joyce Brown (netball) (born 1938), Australian netball player
 Joyce Ann Brown (1947–2015), American wrongfully convicted of robbery and murder in 1980

See also
 Joy Browne (1944–2016), American radio psychologist
Joy Brown Clement (born 1948), American judge